Khatav is a town and taluka (administrative division) located in the Man-Khatav subdivision of the Satara district, India. Khatav has a population of about 22346.

Geography 
Khatav is situated to the south of the Satara district. Vaduj is the capital of the taluka, which is located 13 km south of Khatav. Khatav is surrounded by the Man, Karad, Phaltan and Koregaon talukas and Sangli district boundary. The taluka receives less rainfall than most and is categorised as a drought affected region.

History
Khatav is an ancient place in satara district, situated at the spiritual edge of Yerla River. Khatav was prosperous town and market place in past. Khatav had a military base at the time of Chhatrapati Shivaji Maharaj. Sarnobat Prataprao Gujar was native in Bhosare village which village is adjacent to Khatav. Khatav have some of old damaged places still exist it need to preserve. In Khatav there are historical fortress still intact the past glory of town but now damaged. There are 3 to 4 ancient temples in Khatav town. Prime minister Narendra Modi's one of the most famous mentor named Lakshman Rao Madhav Rao Inamdar was native in Khatav. Khatav name is of taluka territory and town also.

Towns in the taluka 
Vaduj is the main town of Khatav Taluka. Most government offices like Telecom(BSNL), State Bank of India (SBI), PWD, district court are located in Vaduj. This town has a population of around 21,000. 
Mayani is a well developed town in Khatav Taluka. All the facilities like education, hospitals, banking, market are present in this town.

Towns in Khatav taluka:
Vaduj (population 24,560)   
Mayani (population 14,580)
Pusegaon (population 12,670) 
Khatav (population 10,100)
Nimasod (population 10,976)
Kaledhon (population 8762)
Pusesavali (population 6987)
Budh (population 6970)
Chitali (population 6343)
Kuroli (population 5597)
Aundh (population 5578)
Ambavade (population 5134)
Katarkhatav (population 4987)
Diskal (population 4826)
Lalgun (population 2930)
Mhasurne (population 48266)
Visapur (population 4200)
Tadavale (population 3450)
Hingane (population 2689)
Mandave (population 2780)
Nidhal (population 3596)

References 

Cities and towns in Satara district
Talukas in Maharashtra